Michael James Murphy (June 26, 1885 – March 6, 1959) known locally as “M. J. Murphy” was an established master builder in the Carmel-by-the-Sea, California. He had a significant influence on the character and architecture of the Village of Carmel during his career. From 1902 to 1940, he built nearly 350 buildings. He founded M. J. Murphy, Inc., which continues to supply building material for the Monterey Peninsula.

Early life 

Murphy was born in Mendon, Utah, on June 26, 1885. He was one of the twelve children of Michael and Martha Emma Hagle of Mendon, Utah. He grew up on his family's 480-acre Spring Creek cattle ranch. In 1891, his parents sold the ranch and were separated. In 1902, Emma and her five unmarried children moved to Los Angeles. She then took M. J. Murphy and her youngest daughter to Carmel-by-the-Sea, California to meet developer James Franklin Devendorf who promised work for the Murphy. He went back to Idaho to marry Edna M. Owens (1886-1954) on February 13, 1904, in Malad, Oneida, Idaho.

Professional background

M. J. Murphy was trained as a builder and a painter. By 1904, Murphy became associated with Carmel real estate developer James Franklin Devendorf as a builder for the Carmel Development Company. In 1902, Devendorf and Frank Hubbard Powers filed a subdivision map of the village that became Carmel-by-the-Sea. Devendorf purchased much of the land in Carmel and subdivided and sold lots with homes. He asked Murphy to help build the houses. Murphy developed his own designs and did most of the building himself. As his reputation grew, more and more people wanted Murphy built homes.

First Murphy House

In 1902, Murphy, at age 17, built his first one-story wood-framed home, a  cottage, for his mother and sister on Mission Street between fifth and sixth Avenues. The home was a mixture of Victorian and Craftsman Bungalow. It has a horizontal clapboard wood siding and a used brick exterior wall chimney located on the South side. In 1990, to save the house from demolition, and with the support of the Carmel Heritage Society, the citizens of Carmel formed the First Murphy Foundation, which raised $16,000 for the relocation of the Murphy house. The City of Carmel offered city-owned property at Lincoln Street and Sixth Avenue for the relocation site. The house occupies part of First Murphy Park and bronze sculpture on a commemorative wood bench by George W. Lundeen, at the corner of Lincoln and Sixth.

In 1992, the First Murphy House became the home for the Carmel Heritage Society. The house was declared historical by the City of Carmel and was registered with the California Register of Historical Resources on November 7, 2002. The house is significant under California Register criterion 2, for the contributions of Murphy in establishing the early residential character of the village between 1902 and the early 1920s.

In 1914 Murphy became a general contractor and in 1924, he established M. J. Murphy, Inc., a business which sold building supplies, did rock crushing and concrete services, and operated a lumber mill and cabinet shop located between San Carlos and Mission streets. The lumber mill was located where the Wells Fargo Bank and parking lot are today, and the lumber yard is where the Carmel Plaza is today. He used native materials, redwood, sand for cement and gravel from the Carmel River, granite boulders from the Carmel Beach, and Carmel stone for chimneys and trim.

Works
About 350 buildings in Carmel are attributed to Michael J. Murphy. It is estimated that about 80% of the homes in Carmel were designed or constructed by him in the 1930s.

Murphy was hired by Robinson Jeffers to build the first part of the Tor House a small, two-story cottage. During the first stage of construction Jeffers studied under Murphy as an apprentice. After learning all the trades, Jeffers went on to finish the house and build Hawk Tower.

In the 1930s, M. J. Murphy Inc., did the rock crushing and supplied wood materials for the construction of the Big Sur Coast Highway. He was also a Carmel City Council member and helped with the plans for planting trees along Ocean Avenue.

Murphy retired in 1941 and turned his business over to his son James Franklin Murphy. Today, the M. J. Murphy, Lumber & Hardware is operated by his grandsons out of Carmel Valley. After his wife Edna died on June 20, 1954, Murphy moved to Oregon to fish and continue his retired years.

Death
Murphy died on March 6, 1959, at the age of 73, in Lane County, Oregon. He was buried at the Chapel of the Chimes, Alameda, California.

References

External links

 Carmel Heritage Society
 City Of Carmel-By-The-Sea Downtown Conservation District Historic Property Survey
 M. J. Murphy Lumber & Hardware

1885 births
1959 deaths
People from California
People from Utah